Pentobesa is a genus of moths of the family Notodontidae described by Schaus in 1901.

Species
Pentobesa anapiesma Weller, 1991
Pentobesa ankistron Weller, 1991
Pentobesa aroata (Schaus, 1901)
Pentobesa lignicolor Möschler, 1877
Pentobesa seriata (Druce, 1887)
Pentobesa sinistra Weller, 1991
Pentobesa smithsoni Weller, 1991
Pentobesa valta Schaus, 1901
Pentobesa xylinoides (Walker, 1866)

References

Notodontidae